Lindita Idrizi (born 4 November 1996) is an Albanian model and beauty pageant titleholder who was crowned Miss Universe Albania 2016 and represented Albania at the Miss Universe 2016.

Pageantry

Miss Europe Continental 2015
Lindita Idrizi was selected as year 2015 winner of Miss Europe Continental, the Italy's national beauty contest held on 5 September 2015 in Paestum, Italy.

Miss Universe Albania 2016
Idrizi was crowned Miss Universe Albania 2016 and she represented Albania in the Miss Universe 2016.

Miss Universe 2016
Idrizi represented Albania at Miss Universe 2016; she was awarded Miss Photogenic.

References

1996 births
Living people
People from Elbasan
Albanian female models
Miss Universe 2016 contestants
Albanian beauty pageant winners
21st-century Albanian models